The 2007–08 Illinois Fighting Illini men's basketball team represented University of Illinois at Urbana–Champaign in the 2007–08 NCAA Division I men's basketball season. This was head coach Bruce Weber's fifth season at Illinois. The team finished with 5–13 conference and 16–19 overall records. A runner-up finish in the Big Ten tournament, and the play of freshman guard Demetri McCamey highlighted the season. Shaun Pruitt was the lone all-Big-Ten honoree; he was named to the all-Big-Ten third team by the press.

Roster

Schedule

|-
!colspan=12 style="background:#DF4E38; color:white;"| Exhibition

|-
!colspan=12 style="background:#DF4E38; color:white;"| Non-Conference regular season

|-
!colspan=9 style="background:#DF4E38; color:#FFFFFF;"|Big Ten regular season

|-
!colspan=9 style="text-align: center; background:#DF4E38"|Big Ten tournament

Season statistics

See also
Illinois Fighting Illini men's basketball
2008 Big Ten Conference men's basketball tournament

References

Illinois
Illinois Fighting Illini men's basketball seasons
Illinois
Illinois